Princess Margaret (1930–2002) was the daughter of King George VI of the United Kingdom and Elizabeth Bowes-Lyon; sister of Queen Elizabeth II of the United Kingdom.

Princess Margaret may also refer to:

People
 Margaret of York (Duchess of Burgundy) (1446-1503), sister of Edward IV of England 
 Margaret of York (1472) (1472-1472), daughter of Edward IV of England 
 Princess Louise Margaret of Prussia (Duchess of Connaught by marriage) (1860–1917), wife of Prince Arthur, Duke of Connaught, third son of Queen Victoria
 Princess Margaret of Prussia (1872–1954), daughter of Frederick III, German Emperor and Victoria, Princess Royal of the United Kingdom 
 Princess Margaret of Connaught (1882–1920), daughter of Prince Arthur, Duke of Connaught and granddaughter of Queen Victoria
 Princess Margaret of Denmark (1895–1992), daughter of Prince Valdemar of Denmark and granddaughter of Christian IX of Denmark and Louise of Hesse-Kassel (or Hesse-Cassel)
 Princess Margaretha of Sweden (1899–1977), daughter of Prince Carl, Duke of Västergötland and granddaughter of King Oscar II of Sweden and Norway, wife of Prince Axel of Denmark
 Princess Margriet of the Netherlands (born 1942), granddaughter of Queen Wilhelmina of the Netherlands, daughter of Queen Juliana of the Netherlands; sister of Queen Beatrix of the Netherlands and aunt of King Willem Alexander of the Netherlands
 Princess Margareta of Romania (born 1949), eldest daughter of King Michael I of Romania
 Margaret Tudor (1489–1541), daughter of Henry VII

Other uses
 HMS Princess Margaret, Royal Navy World War I minelayer

See also
Princess Margaret Hospital (disambiguation)
Prinses Margriet (disambiguation)
Queen Margaret (disambiguation)